Clare Cunningham may refer to:
Clare Cunningham (athlete), Athlete 
Clare Cunningham (Hollyoaks), fictional character

See also
Claire Cunningham, choreographer and dancer